In mathematics, a Dirac comb (also known as shah function, impulse train or sampling function) is a periodic function with the formula

for some given period . Here t is a real variable and the sum extends over all integers k. The Dirac delta function  and the Dirac comb are tempered distributions. The graph of the function resembles a comb (with the s as the comb's teeth), hence its name and the use of the comb-like Cyrillic letter sha (Ш) to denote the function.

The symbol , where the period is omitted, represents a Dirac comb of unit period. This implies

Because the Dirac comb function is periodic, it can be represented as a Fourier series based on the Dirichlet kernel:

The Dirac comb function allows one to represent both continuous and discrete phenomena, such as sampling and aliasing, in a single framework of continuous Fourier analysis on tempered distributions, without any reference to Fourier series.  The Fourier transform of a Dirac comb is another Dirac comb. Owing to the Convolution Theorem on tempered distributions which turns out to be the Poisson summation formula, in signal processing, the Dirac comb allows modelling sampling by multiplication with it, but it also allows modelling periodization by convolution with it.

Dirac-comb identity 

The Dirac comb can be constructed in two ways, either by using the comb operator (performing sampling) applied to the function that is constantly , or, alternatively, by using the rep operator (performing periodization) applied to the Dirac delta . Formally, this yields

where
 and 

The Dirac comb identity is a particular case of the  Convolution Theorem for tempered distributions.

Scaling 

The scaling property of the Dirac comb follows from the properties of the Dirac delta function. 
Since  for positive real numbers , it follows that:

Note that requiring positive scaling numbers  instead of negative ones is not a restriction because the negative sign would only reverse the order of the summation within , which does not affect the result.

Fourier series 

It is clear that  is periodic with period . That is,

for all t. The complex Fourier series for such a periodic function is

where the Fourier coefficients are (symbolically)

All Fourier coefficients are 1/T resulting in

When the period is one unit, this simplifies to 

Remark: Most rigorously, Riemann or Lebesgue integration over any products including a Dirac delta function yields zero. For this reason, the integration above (Fourier series coefficients determination) must be understood "in the generalized functions sense". It means that, instead of using the characteristic function of an interval applied to the Dirac comb, one uses a so-called Lighthill unitary function as cutout function, see , p.62, Theorem 22 for details.

Fourier transform 
The Fourier transform of a Dirac comb is also a Dirac comb. For the Fourier transform  expressed in frequency domain (Hz) the Dirac comb  of period  transforms into a rescaled Dirac comb of period  i.e. for
 

is proportional to another Dirac comb, but with period  in frequency domain (radian/s).

This result can be established by considering the respective Fourier transforms  of the family of functions  defined by

Since  is a convergent series of Gaussian functions, and Gaussians transform into Gaussians, each of their respective Fourier transforms  also results in a series of Gaussians, and explicit calculation establishes that

Therefore  the functions  and their respective Fourier transforms  converge to the same function and this limit function is a series of infinite equidistant Gaussian spikes, each spike being multiplied by the same pre-factor of one, i.e. the Dirac comb for unit period:

   and   

Since , we obtain in this limit the result to be demonstrated:

The corresponding result for period  can be found by exploiting the scaling property of the Fourier transform,

Another manner to establish that the Dirac comb transforms into another Dirac comb starts by examining continuous Fourier transforms of periodic functions in general, and then specialises to the case of the Dirac comb.
  obeys:

For the special case of the Fourier transform of the Dirac comb, the Fourier series integral over a single period covers only the Dirac function at the origin and thus gives  for each  This can be summarised by interpreting the Dirac comb as a limit of the Dirichlet kernel such that, at the positions  all exponentials in the sum  point into the same direction and add constructively. In other words, the continuous Fourier transform of periodic functions leads to
 with 
and

The Fourier series coefficients  for all  when , i.e. 

is another Dirac comb, but with period  in angular frequency domain (radian/s).

As mentioned, the specific rule depends on the convention for the used Fourier transform. Indeed, when using the scaling property of the Dirac delta function, the above may be re-expressed in ordinary frequency domain (Hz) and one obtains again:

such that the unit period Dirac comb transforms to itself:

Finally, the Dirac comb is also an eigenfunction of the unitary continuous Fourier transform in angular frequency space to the eigenvalue 1 when  because for the unitary Fourier transform 

the above may be re-expressed as

Sampling and aliasing

Multiplying any function by a Dirac comb transforms it into a train of impulses with integrals equal to the value of the function at the nodes of the comb. This operation is frequently used to represent sampling.

Due to the self-transforming property of the Dirac comb and the convolution theorem, this corresponds to convolution with the Dirac comb in the frequency domain.

This leads to a natural formulation of the Nyquist–Shannon sampling theorem. If the spectrum of the function  contains no frequencies higher than B  (i.e., its spectrum is nonzero only in the interval ) then samples of the original function at intervals  are sufficient to reconstruct the original signal. It suffices to multiply the spectrum of the sampled function by a suitable rectangle function, which is equivalent to applying a brick-wall lowpass filter.

In time domain, this "multiplication with the rect function" is equivalent to "convolution with the sinc function" (p.33-34). Hence, it restores the original function from its samples. This is known as the Whittaker–Shannon interpolation formula.

Remark: Most rigorously, multiplication of the rect function with a generalized function, such as the Dirac comb, fails. This is due to undetermined outcomes of the multiplication product at the interval boundaries. As a workaround, one uses a Lighthill unitary function instead of the rect function. It is smooth at the interval boundaries, hence it yields determined multiplication products everywhere, see , p.62, Theorem 22 for details.

Use in directional statistics 

In directional statistics, the Dirac comb of period  is equivalent to a wrapped Dirac delta function and is the analog of the Dirac delta function in linear statistics.

Just as the integral of the product of a Dirac delta function with an arbitrary function over the real-number line yields the value of that function at zero, so the integral of the product of a Dirac comb of period  with an arbitrary function of period  over the unit circle yields the value of that function at zero.

See also

Comb filter
Frequency comb
Poisson summation formula

References

Further reading 
 .
 
 .
 .

Special functions
Generalized functions
Signal processing
Directional statistics